Boai or BOAI may refer to:

 Budapest Open Access Initiative, conference convened by the Open Society Institute in 2001
 Bo'ai County, in Henan, China